The 67th Brigade was an infantry brigade of  the British Army. It was raised as part of the New Army, also known as Kitchener's Army and assigned to the 22nd Division and served on the Western Front and the Macedonian Front during the First World War.

Formation
The infantry battalions did not all serve at once, but all were assigned to the brigade during the war.
 11th (Service) Battalion, Royal Welsh Fusiliers
 7th (Service) Battalion, South Wales Borderers
 8th (Service) Battalion, South Wales Borderers 
 11th (Service) Battalion, Welsh Regiment
 67th Machine Gun Company 	
 67th SAA Section Ammunition Column
 67th Trench Mortar Battery

References

Infantry brigades of the British Army in World War I
B067